Most air ambulance services in Canada are operated by third parties including NGO's and private contractors working on behalf of a provincial health authority. There are a mix of fixed wing and rotary wing/HEMS fleets used in Canada.The two largest providers are Ornge Air Ambulance in Ontario which operates 12 bases across the province and STARS Air Ambulance which operates 6 bases across Alberta, Saskatchewan and Manitoba.

List of air ambulances in Canada by province

Alberta
Alberta Health Services (AHS EMS)
Alberta Central Air Ambulance Ltd
STARS - Shock Trauma Air Rescue Society
Sunwest Aeromedical
APL - Advanced Paramedics Ltd
Lifesupport Air Medical Services
HALO Rescue
HERO YMM

British Columbia
 Assurance Air Medical Inc. - operating out of base at Vancouver International Airport.
 BC Ambulance Service - Air Ambulance Program
 Helijet- operated for British Columbia Ambulance Service
 Life Flight International Inc. Worldwide Air Ambulance
 STARS - Shock Trauma Air Rescue Society - eastern BC only
 Summit Helicopters - operated in partnership with British Columbia Ambulance Service to service the interior of British Columbia.
 Lifespport Air Medical Services
Northern Thunderbird Air
 Technical evacuation advanced aero  medical TEAAM 
https://www.teaam.ca/

Manitoba
 STARS - Shock Trauma Air Rescue Society
 Lifeflight Air Ambulance

New Brunswick
 Ambulance New Brunswick Air Ambulance Program - AirCare

Newfoundland and Labrador
 Med Flight NL

Northwest Territories
Advanced Medical Solutions - Medic North

Nova Scotia
 LifeFlight

Nunavut
 Advanced Medical Solutions - Medic North (West)
 Nunavut Lifeline - Kivalliq Air (East)

Ontario
 Skyservice Air Ambulance
 Latitude AeroMedical Works
 Ornge
 Brock Air Services
 Angels of Flight Canada
Fox Flight Air Ambulance
 Lifespport Air Medical Services

Prince Edward Island
 LifeFlight

Quebec
 Airmedic
 Helico Secours cooperative of solidarity

Saskatchewan
 Saskatchewan Air Ambulance
 Shock Trauma Air Rescue Society

Yukon
 Alkan Air

References

Air ambulance services in Canada
Ambulance services in Canada
Air ambulances